The Advertising Standards Authority for Ireland (ASAI)  is the self-regulatory organisation (SRO) for advertising industry in Ireland. The 7th edition of its code was introduced with effect from March 2016. It has a Complaints Committee to deal with allegations by members of the public of breaches of its code.

History
The ASAI was established in 1981 and substantially restructured in 1988 at the request of the Director of Consumer Affairs, to place the complaints handling at arm's length from the industry representation.

In 2018, the ASAI for the first time upheld a complaint against a blogger, for consumer-generated advertising of makeup using retouched photographs of herself.

Other regulators
As well as the ASAI, advertising in specific media types or of specific product and service types are subject to regulation by other bodies or statutes; for example broadcast advertising by the Broadcasting Authority of Ireland, financial services by the Central Bank of Ireland, and solicitors by the Law Society of Ireland.

References

Sources

Citations

External links
 

Mass media in the Republic of Ireland
Mass media complaints authorities
Self-regulatory organizations of the advertising industry
1981 establishments in Ireland
Organizations established in 1981
Consumer organisations in Ireland
Regulation in Ireland